Victory over the Swedish army in the Battle of Lihula inspired the Oeselians to further fighting. In 1221 they tried to conquer the Danish stronghold in Tallinn with the help of Revalians, Harrians, and Vironians. They besieged the stronghold for 14 days and all Danish outbreaks were repulsed. One day, four cogs appeared unexpectedly, which the Oeselians thought to have been carrying the Royal Army of the Danish king. The siege was ended and the Oeselians left.

References

Tallinn
Tallinn
1221 in Europe
Tallinn
History of Tallinn
Tallinn